France and Russia signed a treaty of peace in Paris on 8 October 1801. The treaty formally ended Russo-French hostilities in the War of the Second Coalition. Two days later, on 10 October, they signed a secret convention of alliance. The signatories for both were Charles-Maurice de Talleyrand-Périgord for France and Count Arkady Morkov for Russia. Ratifications were exchanged on 11 October. The French law recognizing the treaty is dated 9 December 1801.

The public peace treaty contained declarations of perpetual peace and friendship. The secret convention contained the real bases for Franco-Russian relations going forward. It contained an agreement to work together to a satisfactory arrangement in the Holy Roman Empire, which at the time was in the process of putting into effect the terms of the Treaty of Lunéville of 9 February 1801 through the a Reichsdeputation. France and Russia declared it their intent to find a "just equilibrium between the Houses of Austria and Brandenburg", that is, between the Habsburgs and the Hohenzollern. Since the Tsar Alexander I was related to the rulers of Baden, Bavaria and Württemberg, First Consul Napoléon Bonaparte agreed to increase to their power to counterbalance the Habsburgs of Austria and Hohenzollern of Brandenburg–Prussia.

The Russo-French peace was part of a flurry of diplomatic activity winding down the War of the Second Coalition. Shortly before the peace with Russia, France signed a preliminary agreement with the United Kingdom in London on 1 October. This ultimately resulted in the Peace of Amiens. On 4 October, Morkov signed  in Paris with Spain. Between the two Franco-Russian agreements, France signed a preliminary peace with the Ottoman Empire in Paris on 9 October. This was finalized in the Treaty of Paris of June 1802.

Text

Notes

Bibliography

Paris 1801
Paris 1801
Paris 1801
Paris 1801
Paris
1801 in the Russian Empire
1801 in France
France–Russia relations
Bilateral treaties of Russia
Bilateral treaties of France
War of the Second Coalition
October 1801 events